Klingen can refer to:

Places
Klinga, Norway, a village in the municipality of Namsos in Trøndelag county, Norway
Klinga (municipality), a former municipality now in the municipality of Namsos in Trøndelag county, Norway
Klingen (Oberpfalz) near the small town of Hemau in Southern Germany

Other
Klingen, a Danish art magazine based in Copenhagen, Denmark

See also
Klinga (disambiguation)